Abdelaziz Sfar,, (born November 7, 1939 in Bizert  –  April 29, 2012 in Tunis is a Tunisian handball player, teacher and leader.

Life 
He studied in INSEP, Expertise and Performance in Vincennes (1962-1966). He obtained a CAPEPS in Normal School of Physical Education in Paris in June 1966, a graduate diploma specialized in administrative sports management (Organization and operation of school sport according to the greatest number) in the same establishment in October 1976.

Abdelaziz  is also a teacher and researcher at the Higher Institute of Sport and Physical Education in Ksar Said, of which he became director between 1969 and 1973 and, a second time, between 1995 and 2000.

Died on April 29, 2012, he was buried the next day in Mahdia.

References 

1939 births
2012 deaths
Tunisian male handball players